These are the results of the men's C-2 1000 metres competition in canoeing at the 2004 Summer Olympics.  The C-2 event is raced by two-man sprint canoes.

Medalists

Heats
The 14 teams first raced in two heats.  The top three finishers from each of the heats advanced directly to the final, and the remaining 8 teams moved on to the semifinal.  The heats were raced on August 23, 2004.

Semifinal
The top three finishers in the semifinal advanced to the final, joining the six teams who had moved directly from the heats.  All other teams were eliminated.  The semifinals were raced on August 25, 2004.

Final
The final was raced on August 27, 2004.

References
2004 Summer Olympics Canoe sprint results 
Sports-reference.com 2004 C-2 1000 m results.
Yahoo! Sports Athens 2004 Summer Olympics Canoe/Kayak Results

Men's C-2 1000
Men's events at the 2004 Summer Olympics